Werner Kaessmann (born 12 July 1947 in Unna) is a former field hockey player from Germany, who was a member of the West German squad that won the gold medal at the 1972 Summer Olympics in Munich. He also competed in the 1976 Summer Olympics, as the West German team finished fifth.

External links
 
 Werner Kaessmann's profile at Sports Reference.com

1947 births
Living people
German male field hockey players
Olympic field hockey players of West Germany
Field hockey players at the 1972 Summer Olympics
Field hockey players at the 1976 Summer Olympics
Olympic medalists in field hockey
Olympic gold medalists for West Germany
Medalists at the 1972 Summer Olympics
People from Unna
Sportspeople from Arnsberg (region)
20th-century German people